Agrotis emboloma is a moth of the family Noctuidae. It is found in the New South Wales, South Australia and Western Australia.

External links
Australian Faunal Directory

Agrotis
Moths of Australia
Moths described in 1918